The HTC Desire 816 is a mid ranged  Android-based smartphone designed and manufactured by HTC. Announced at the 2014 Mobile World Congress in Barcelona, Spain, it features a 5.5-inch super LCD 2 display with a 1280x720 resolution, with full HD video recording and play-back.

Features
HTC Desire 816 offers HTC Sense 6, a 1.6 GHz Qualcomm Snapdragon 400 system on chip with 1.5 GB RAM, 8 GB internal memory, 128 GB external memory capacity and a non removable 2600 mAh battery. It also comes with a 13.0 MP rear-facing camera and 5 MP front-facing camera.  It has dual front facing speakers with Boom Sound.  The smartphone runs on android version 4.4.2 and is upgradeable to 5.0.2, lollipop, globally in April 2015.

Firmware Upgrade
In March, HTC revamped its sense home to a version 7.  Users can create their own phone theme or can access and  use various themes, wallpapers, sounds.  This works best with HTC Sense 7 and the HTC "zoe" feature fully active. New power saving and extreme power saving options extend battery life or when the users need to ward off from switching off the phone due to low battery level.

Apps include one that operates the integral FM broadcast receiver.

Successors
HTC also launched new HTC Desire 816G in September that runs on Android 4.4 KitKat OS and a Mediatek processor. HTC Desire 820 is the successor of desire 816.

See also

 Comparison of HTC devices
 HTC Desire C
 HTC Desire 620
 HTC Desire Eye
 HTC Desire Z

References

Android (operating system) devices
Desire 816
Mobile phones introduced in 2014
Discontinued smartphones